Al Khor is a coastal city in northern Qatar, located 50 kilometres north of the capital, Doha. Considered one of Qatar's largest cities, it is the capital city of the municipality of Al Khor. The name of the city means creek in Arabic; it was given this name because the original settlement was built on a creek.

Al Khor is home to many employees of the oil industry due to its proximity to Qatar's northern oil and natural gas fields and to Ras Laffan Industrial City. It was also the venue for the opening game of the 2022 FIFA World Cup.

History
Historically, Al Khor was ruled by the Al Muhannadi, a tribe which consists of several Bedouin families. According to oral tradition, Al Khor was first settled by the Al Muhannadi tribe in the late 18th century. The settlement expanded its borders after one of their hunting groups discovered a substantial water source near the coast in the mid-19th century. This led them to construct Ain Hleetan Well, which helped sustain the villagers' basic needs. Some locals believed that water obtained from Ain Hleetan possessed medicinal properties. In turn, the villagers built the Al Khor Towers around 1900, for the purpose of defending both the well and its harbor.

In the 1820s, George Barnes Brucks carried out the first British survey of the Persian Gulf. He recorded the following notes about Al Khor, which he referred to as Khore Sheditch:
"Khore Sheditch is a small boat harbour, to the southward of Ras Mut Buck, having from one and a half to two and a half fathoms water in it ; its entrance is in lat. 25° 40' 10' N., long. 51° 34' 50' E. The point at the entrance of Khore Aegarah is in lat. 25° 43' 10" N., long. 51° 36' 40" E. The Khore is small, having only one fathom in it."

J. G. Lorimer's Gazetteer of the Persian Gulf gives an account of Al Khor (referred to as Khor Shaqiq) in 1908:

Due to the continuous expansion at Ras Laffan Industrial City, the number of facilities and services available in the town is rapidly increasing. In October 2015, Ashghal (Public Works Authority) revealed that it would be investing billions of Qatari riyals into developing infrastructure in Al Khor. Its plan includes the creation of additional hospitals and schools, and the refurbishment of the road system.

Geography
Qatar's capital, Doha, is located at a distance of 57 km to the south. Other distances include Umm Salal Ali – 32 km to the south, Zubarah – 46 km away, Madinat ash Shamal – 47.2 km away, Al Wakrah – 44.7 km away, and Dukhan – 86.7 km away.

Al Khor overlooks a sheltered bay upon which Al Khor Island (also known as Purple Island and Jazirat Bin Ghanim) lies. The width of the bay ranges from 2.2 to 6.5 km. It is linked to the open sea by a channel with a width of roughly 750 meters on its southern end. 

Furthermore, the waters had a salinity of 48.58 psu, an average temperature of 24.72°C and 6.44 mg/L of dissolved oxygen.

Climate 
The following is climate data for Al Khor City.

Sports
One major sports stadium currently exists in the city: Al-Khor SC Stadium, whose tenants are Al Khor SC. Al Bayt Stadium is planned to be completed by the 2022 FIFA World Cup. Al Bayt Stadium, which translates to 'the house', is designed to replicate a traditional tent used by Qatari nomads. The seating capacity will be 60,000 spectators and it is set to host one of the semi-finals. The Italian industrial group Salini Impregilo was contracted to oversee the stadium's construction operations for a fee of QR 3.1 billion.

Health

The city is currently served by Al Khor General Hospital, which is under the auspices of Hamad Medical Corporation. It has a bed capacity of 115 and was opened in May 2005 as the first multi-specialty healthcare facility situated outside of Doha. Health services provided by the hospital include general medical care, general surgery, obstetrics, pediatrics and neonatal care. There are also a number of health centers, one of the largest being Al Khor Community Medical Centre.

Ashghal (Public Works Authority) announced their intent to open a hospital with a bed capacity of 500 at a cost of QR 3.6 billion by 2017. Also included in the plan was a modern health center.

Education

In 1952, the city witnessed the opening of the first formal school outside of the capital Doha. The city's first public library was opened in 1977.

Al Khor International School is the main school in Al Khor, accommodating 4,000 students of families employed by Qatargas. In 2015, a government-sanctioned plan saw the allocation of QR 200 million towards building new schools with a planned completion date of late 2016.

Residential projects
Families of Qatargas were provided with accommodation in Al Khor Housing Community, one of the most sizable residential complexes in the country. Al Khor International School is located within the community. An investment of over QR 2 billion has been afforded on the complex over the years by Alaqaria, a subsidiary of Barwa Group.

Visitor attractions

Attractions in Al Khor include Al-Sultan beach hotel & resort, a palace that turned into a hotel, and its large concentrations of modern and historical mosques. The main industry of the city is fishing. There are several beaches surrounding Al Khor, and the beaches south of it are home to many beach houses owned by both residents of the city and residents of Doha.

Al Khor Mall is the primary mall in the city, opening its doors in 2012. The city's first cinema was slated to open in Al Khor Mall at the end of 2015.

The city has one of the largest parks - Al Khor Park in Qatar with an area of 240,000 sq m. Starting in June 2010, the government has invested QR 250 million in refurbishing the park. This has resulted in the development of new facilities in the park such as a mini-golf course, a railway station and a museum. Renovated Park was opened officially on February 18, 2016.

Located in a former two-level police station along the coast in Al Khor City is the Al Khor Archaeological Museum. It houses artifacts collected from expeditions carried out in the municipality. On the ground floor of the museum, handiwork relating to Qatar's cultural heritage are on display, and there are exhibits on the maritime traditions historically engaged in by Qataris, such as fishing and ship-building. Ancient artifacts obtained from excavations, including those done on the dye industry in Al Khor Island, are hosted on the first floor, as well as geographic maps of Al Khor. On the second level, visitors are provided with a view of the bay and docks near the museum.

Natural attractions
Al Khor Island (commonly known as Purple Island) is located near the city. Considered to be a domestic ecoturism destination, the island is connected to Al Khor by a tapered dirt path which runs through a number of streams.

A fenced-off beach known as Al Khor Family Beach provides a recreational space for families. It is situated on the Farkeeh Coast and accommodates bathrooms, a playground and a concession stand.

Historic sites
Three historic watchtowers, known as the Al Khor Towers, remain near Al Khor's shoreline, having been built in the late 19th century to early 20th century. Their primary purposes were to provide a vantage point and to scout for potential attacks. The three towers, each cylindrical in shape, have walls that are 60 cm thick and diameters of approximately 4 m each.

Comprising two houses adjacent to a marketplace, the Al Ansari Property is situated in the central part of Al Khor. It was constructed around 1930 for members of the Al Ansari family, whom also owned the neighboring Al Khor Souq, which dates back to 1910. The houses underwent several expansions after their construction in order to lodge more family members.

Culture
A well-known local myth is that of May and Gilan, the alleged progenitors of the sail. According to tradition, in old times, a wealthy man named Ghilan resided in Al Khor. Besides commanding a crew of sailors and fishermen, he owned numerous pearling boats. As time passed, a woman named May who commanded superior number of boats and crewmen emerged as Ghilan's main adversary. In an incident in which both crews were attempting to harvest the same pearl bed, May taunted Ghilan as her ship raced past his. This incensed Ghilan, who set out to discover a way to best his competitor. While observing a grasshopper, Ghilan took note of how its wings worked, and applied the same principle to his boats, giving rise to the sail. This enabled his boats to travel at higher speeds, allowing him to outpace May's boats to the densest pearl beds. The myth is typically presented in five sequences and is unlike most other known Bedouin stories. According to locals of Al Khor, the myth originated from the Al Muhannadi tribe of Al Khor. The story is not well-known elsewhere in Qatar.

Transport

Air
Aviation traffic is controlled by Al Khor Airport. The airport is mostly used by general aviation aircraft and has served as the venue of the annual Al Khor Fly-In since 2008. The fly-in lasts for two days and allows visitors to travel in and spectate aircraft. Aircraft from other GCC countries are showcased at the event.

Road
Turkish company Tekfen was contracted to construct the $2.1 billion Al Khor Expressway in August 2016. The expressway is designed to be 34 km in length and will run from Doha Golf Club in Al Egla, a locality of Al Daayen, up to Al Bayt Stadium in Al Khor City. A designated bicycle lane and ten interchanges are to be incorporated as part of the project.

Commutes between the capital Doha and the municipality of Al Khor are currently facilitated by Al Shamal Road and Al Khor Coastal Road, with the latter road running through Al Daayen and the former running through Umm Salal.

Al Khor and Ras Laffan are connected through Al Huwailah Link Road. In November 2014, the 16-km road was ameliorated by increasing it from one lane to four lanes. Qatar's longest highway, Al Majd Road (formerly known as the Orbital Highway), links Al Khor with the south-eastern coastal city of Mesaieed.

Rail
As of 2019, the elevated Al Khor Metro Station is under construction, having been launched during Phase 1A. Once completed, it will be part of Doha Metro's Red Line North.

Administration
When free elections of the Central Municipal Council first took place in Qatar during 1999, Al Khor was designated the seat of constituency no. 26. It would remain the headquarters of constituency no. 26 for the next three consecutive elections until the fifth municipal elections in 2015, when it was made the headquarters of constituency no. 25. Also included in its constituency is Simaisma, Al Daayen Village, north Lusail, and Ras Matbakh. In the inaugural municipal elections in 1999, Rashid Jassim Al-Mohannadi won the elections, receiving 63.3%, or 283 votes. The runner-up candidate was Saleh Majed Al-Mohannadi, whose share of the votes was 12.3%, or 54 votes. Voter turnout was 83.4% Al-Mohannadi retained his seat in the 2002 elections. For the 2007 elections, Saqer Saeed Al-Mohannadi was elected. He once again won the next elections in 2011 to retain his seat. The 2015 elections saw Nasser Ibrahim Al-Mohannadi elected constituent representative.

Archaeology

At Al Khor Island off the bay, excavations have uncovered four main periods of occupation, dating from as early as c. 2000 BC to as late as 1900 AD. The island is best known for being the site of operation of a Kassite-controlled purple dye industry in the second millennium BC.

It was uncovered in 1976 by the French Archaeological Mission in Qatar and was dubbed "F.P.P." in the team's reports. Béatrix Midant-Reynes, a member of the team, excavated eight of the burial mounds starting in 1976. The first grave excavated had a length of roughly 2.6 meters, a width of 1.6 meters and was 20 centimeters tall. Two roof slabs that measured 40 by 50 centimeters and 60 by 30 centimeters, respectively, were used as cover for the cairn. Four layers of stone slabs were found in the mound. Underneath the slabs was a sandy pit containing sea snail shells.

The second grave excavated by the team was more substantial in size, having a length of 3.5 meters, a width of 3 meters and stood 30 meters tall. Decayed skeletal remains were uncovered in this grave. Similar to the other grave, flat stone slabs were also discovered in this mound, some fitted into the bedrock, however no pit was found. Fifteen sea snails were discovered inside this cairn.

More substantial finds would be recovered from the remaining six excavations. The team concluded that some graves were reserved for individuals while others were apparently family burials. Artifacts uncovered included shell beads, obsidian beads and carnelian beads. The cairns are of indeterminable age but are thought to date from some time in the Neolithic period.

Demographics

The following table shows the population of Al Khor.

Twin towns and sister cities

 Chita, Japan (since 2004)

 Gangnam, South Korea (since 2009)

Gallery

References

Populated places in Al Khor
Cities in Qatar
Populated coastal places in Qatar